Apparent motion may refer to:

Astronomy
Aberration of light, an apparent shift in position of celestial objects due to the finite speed of light and the motion of Earth in its orbit around the Sun
Diurnal motion, the apparent motion of objects in the sky due to the Earth's rotation on its axis
Parallax, the apparent motion of objects due to the changing angle of observation of an observer on Earth revolving around the Sun

Perceptual illusions
Beta movement, an illusion of movement where two or more still images are combined by the brain into surmised motion
Illusory motion, the appearance of movement in a static image
Phi phenomenon, an illusion of movement created when two or more adjacent lights blink on and off in succession
Stroboscopic effect, a phenomenon that occurs when continuous motion is represented by a series of short or instantaneous samples
Wagon-wheel effect, temporal aliasing effect in which a spoked wheel appears to rotate differently from its true rotation

Other uses
Optical flow, a term used in computer science for the apparent motion of objects in a scene caused by the relative motion between an observer and the scene
The motion of objects observed from a non-inertial reference frame